Souls to Deny is the fourth album by the death metal band Suffocation marking the end of a six-year hiatus. This is the first album featuring former guitarist Guy Marchais (ex-Pyrexia, ex-Internal Bleeding) and marks the return of original drummer, Mike Smith. They did not have a bassist during the recording; bass guitar tracks on the album are played by guitarist Terrance Hobbs and drummer Mike Smith. The cover artwork is by artist Dan Seagrave.

Track listing

Personnel

Suffocation
 Frank Mullen – vocals
 Terrance Hobbs – lead guitar, bass
 Guy Marchais – rhythm guitar
 Mike Smith – drums, bass

Production
 Dan Seagrave – cover art
 David Ungar – band photography
 Joe Cincotta – engineering, mixing
 Scott Hull – mastering

References

Suffocation (band) albums
2004 albums
Albums with cover art by Dan Seagrave
Relapse Records albums